Bertuccio can refer to:

Bertuccio Valiero (Venice, July 1, 1596 - Venice, March 29, 1658), 102nd Doge of Venice
 Giovanni Bertuccio, a character in The Count of Monte Cristo
 A character in Mirette (opera)
 A character in Gankutsuou